James Emanuel Johan Willem Sharpe (born 9 November 1962 in Eindhoven) is a Dutch former politician, businessman and athlete of Aruban descent. As a member of the Party for Freedom (Partij voor de Vrijheid) he was an MP from 17 June till 19 November 2010. He focused on matters of sports, infrastructure and big projects, and was succeeded by Ino van den Besselaar. He resigned his seat in the Dutch parliament after it came out that he was in charge of the Hungarian telecom company Digitania when it received a record fine in 2008 for misleading customers.

Sharpe studied financial economics at Tilburg University, participated in hurdling competitions, among others for the Netherlands Antilles at the 1992 Summer Olympics, and performed several management jobs in telecommunications.

He is married twice and lives in the Romanian municipality of Sângeorgiu de Mureș.

References 
  Parlement.com biography
 Freedom Party (PVV) MP James Sharpe has resigned his seat in the Dutch parliament following controversy about his past 

1962 births
Living people
Athletes (track and field) at the 1992 Summer Olympics
Dutch businesspeople
Dutch economists
Dutch expatriates in Hungary
Dutch male hurdlers
Dutch people of Aruban descent
Members of the House of Representatives (Netherlands)
Olympic athletes of the Netherlands Antilles
Party for Freedom politicians
Sportspeople from Eindhoven
Tilburg University alumni
21st-century Dutch politicians
Dutch Zionists
Dutch sportsperson-politicians